Chicken Ranch may refer to:

Chicken Ranch (Texas), a former brothel in Texas
Chicken Ranch (Nevada), an operating brothel in Nevada, inspired by the original Texas brothel
Chicken Ranch (film), a 1983 documentary film about the brothel in Nevada
Chicken Ranch Rancheria, an Indian reservation or rancheria in Toulumne County, California